Gradac may refer to:

Bosnia and Herzegovina 

 Gradac, Derventa, a village in Bosnia and Herzegovina
 Gradac, Foča, a village in Bosnia and Herzegovina
 Gradac, Hadžići, a village in Bosnia and Herzegovina
 Gradac, Kakanj, a village in Bosnia and Herzegovina
 Gradac, Kiseljak, a village in Bosnia and Herzegovina
 Gradac, Ljubinje, a village in Bosnia and Herzegovina
 Gradac, Neum, a village in Bosnia and Herzegovina
 Gradac, Novo Goražde, a village in Bosnia and Herzegovina
 Gradac, Pale, a village in Bosnia and Herzegovina
 Gradac, Posušje, a village in Bosnia and Herzegovina

Croatia 

 Gradac, Požega-Slavonia County, a village in Croatia
 Gradac, Split-Dalmatia County, a municipality in Croatia
 Gradac, Šibenik-Knin County, a village in Croatia

Montenegro 
 Gradac, Pljevlja, a village in Montenegro

Serbia 

 Gradac, a former name of the city of Čačak
 Gradac (river), a river in Serbia
 Gradac Monastery, a medieval monastery in Serbia
 Gradac, Batočina, a village in Serbia
 Gradac, Brus, a village in Serbia
 Gradac, Ivanjica, a village in Serbia
 Gradac, Raška, a village in Serbia
 Gradac, Sjenica, a village in Serbia
 Gradac, Tutin, a village in Serbia

Slovenia 

 Gradac, Slovenia, a village in Slovenia

See also 

 Gradec (disambiguation)
 Donji Gradac (disambiguation)
 Gornji Gradac (disambiguation)

Serbo-Croatian toponyms
Serbo-Croatian place names